Scandia is a brand name of Scandinavian-themed family amusement centers in California. Although each location shares a similar name, nearly each location is owned and operated by different companies. Scandia Fun Center in Sacramento, Scandia Family Fun Center in Victorville, and the former Scandia Amusement Park in Ontario are owned by Scandia Amusements. The Ontario location was sold in February 2019 to an unknown buyer, who will convert the property for other uses. Some of the attractions will be moved to the Victorville location while others, including the Miler Big Coaster, have been listed for sale. Scandia Family Fun Center in Rohnert Park, California is owned and operated by "Skandia Funland Inc.", while Scandia Golfland in Fairfield, California is owned and operated by Golfland.

All locations are adjacent to a major freeway, and include attractions such as an arcade, bumper boats, batting cages, miniature golf, and a go-kart track. Scandia Amusement Park in Ontario was the only location to include a full amusement park, including two roller coasters, called the "Scandia Screamer" and "Little Screamer", along with twelve other amusement rides.

On March 26, 2007, noise complaints from neighboring residents caused Scandia Fun Center in Sacramento to implement a "No-Shrieking" policy for riders on the Scandia Screamer.

References

External links
Official Website
Scandia Amusement Park on Rollercoaster Database
Scandia Family Fun Center in Rohnert Park, CA

Amusement parks in California
Tourist attractions in Sacramento, California
Ontario, California
Tourist attractions in San Bernardino County, California